is the fifth major label album release of the Japanese rock band, The Back Horn.  The album was released on April 19, 2006.

Track list

Chaos Diver (カオスダイバー) – 4:50
Thirteenth major single.
Apoptosis (アポトーシス) – 4:51
Shōmei (証明) – 4:38
White Noise (ホワイトノイズ) – 5:08
Sekai no Hate de (世界の果てで) – 4:38
Tenki Yohō (天気予報) – 3:11
Fighting Man Blues (ファイティングマンブルース) – 4:15
Black Hole Birthday (ブラックホールバースデイ＜Album Version＞) – 5:35
Eleventh major single.
Ukiyo no Nami (浮世の波) –  – 4:25
Yurikago (ゆりかご) – 5:19
Hajimete no Kokyū de (初めての呼吸で＜Album Mix Version＞) – 5:15
Twelfth major single.

The Back Horn albums
2006 albums
Victor Entertainment albums